Ngahue Reserve is a multi-purpose stadium in the suburb of St Johns in Auckland, New Zealand.  It is used for association football matches and is the home of Oceania Football Confederation. It is also used as a training ground for Eastern Suburbs.

Ngahue Reserve was the venue of the 2022 OFC Champions League.

History
Originally Ngahue Reserve was a landfill that consisted of composting rejected materials. In 1986 the landfill was closed and became a cleanfill site. The cleanfill site did not include putrescible and organic material and metal objects unlike the landfill previously. In 1989 the site was capped until 1997 before being recontoured.

In 2014 the two artificial pitches were completed. The OFC facilities were not completed until the following year.

References

2014 establishments in New Zealand
Association football venues in New Zealand
Sports venues in Auckland
Sports venues completed in 2014
Association football in Auckland